Abu'l-Fath Yusuf ibn Ya'qub, was a Persian vizier of the Ghaznavid Sultan Arslan-Shah. Not much is known about the early life of Abu'l-Fath, except that he may have been the brother of Ghaznavid statesman Abu'l-Ala ibn Ya'qub Nakuk. In 1116, Abu'l-Fath was appointed by Arslan-Shah as his vizier, where Abu'l-Fath became highly influential and gained much power. However, this was short-lived; one year later, Arslan-Shah's brother Bahram-Shah, with the aid of the Seljuq Sultan Ahmad Sanjar, defeated and killed Arslan-Shah, and Bahram-Shah then took control over the Ghaznavid Empire. Abu'l-Fath fell from favor after Arslan-Shah's death, and probably shared the same fate as the latter.

References

Sources 
 C. E. Bosworth "Abu'l-Fath Yusuf." Encyclopedia Iranica. 24 May 2014. <http://www.iranicaonline.org/articles/abul-fath-yusof-b>
 

11th-century births
1117 deaths
12th-century Iranian people
Ghaznavid viziers